Meconium peritonitis refers to rupture of the bowel prior to birth, resulting in fetal stool (meconium) escaping into the surrounding space (peritoneum) leading to inflammation (peritonitis). Despite the bowel rupture, many infants born after meconium peritonitis in utero have normal bowels and have no further issues.

Infants with cystic fibrosis are at increased risk for meconium peritonitis.

Signs and symptoms

Diagnosis
Twenty percent of infants born with meconium peritonitis will have vomiting and dilated bowels on x-rays which necessitates surgery.

Meconium peritonitis is sometimes diagnosed on prenatal ultrasound where it appears as calcifications  within the peritoneum.

Treatment
Adhesiolysis
partial resection of pseudocyst
covering enterostomy.

History
Meconium peritonitis was first described in 1838 by Carl von Rokitansky.

References

External links 

Peritoneum disorders
Obstetrics
Health issues in pregnancy